Vadul-Rașcov is a commune located in Șoldănești District, Moldova stretched along the right bank of the Dniester River. The commune is composed of two villages, Socola and Vadul-Rașcov. It is approximately 130 km northeast of the capital, Chişinău. The population is 1 648.

History
The history of this location is over 2.5 thousand years ago. The Cave monastery in Socola, which already existed in 10th century. The Monastery complex has 7 levels of cells, also known as 7 floor cave monastery. The complex ix expanded to 3 parts in 1.5 km long along the Dniestr river. Due to very difficult way to get in the monastery and relatively far distance from Chisinau the location remain absolutely original, without any signs of current civilization, and remain exactly as it was left about 300 years ago. 
The village is also known as the border place for trading route for many centuries. Before the Dubasari hydroelectric dam was built the river was much lower, and it was a perfect place to cross the river by fording. Due to the rocks on the both banks of the river (over 200 meters difference) the place was naturally secured from being easy invaded.

In 1930, approximately 2,000 Jews lived in this village. During World War II, the nazis massacred the local Jewish community.

The vast majority of the population of Vadul-Rașcov work in agriculture. The main tourist attraction is the Dniester River.

References 

Communes of Șoldănești District
Populated places on the Dniester